Podalia habitus is a moth of the family Megalopygidae. It was described by Henry Edwards in 1887. It occurs in Mexico.

References

Moths described in 1887
Megalopygidae